The Only Son is Ugandan film written and directed by Richard Mulindwa starring Bobby Tamale, Michael Wawuyo Snr., Raymond Rushabiro, and Nisha Kalema. The film was released on 22 July 2016 at the Kampala Serena Hotel. The film was nominated in six categories at the 2016 Uganda Film Festival including Best Screenplay, Best Sound, Best Editing, Film of the Year, Best lead Actor and Best Feature Film.

Plot 
Davis (Bobby Tamale) is set to face the biggest challenges of his life when his father is diagnosed with cancer. While his father (Michael Wawuyo) is worried about the future of his legacy, all his goods and businesses allegedly get to be frozen due to embezzlement issues. The lavish and careless Davis has to man up and start over again but will he manage his new life on the street even after losing his friends, girlfriend and can't live in the village as ordered by his father.

Failing to get along with the village conditions, Davis now moves back to town; a journey that introduces him to the biggest challenges of his life and people that help him change it completely.

Cast 
 Bobby Tamale as Davis
 Michael Wawuyo Sr. as Father
 Raymond Rushabiro as Uncle
 Nisha Kalema as Diana
 Doreen Nabbanja as Sylvia

Awards

Nominated
 2016: Best Screenplay, Best Sound, Best Editing, Film of the Year/Best Director, Best lead Actor and Best Feature Film - Uganda Film Festival Awards

References

External links 

Ugandan drama films
Films shot in Uganda
2016 films